The Flexor digiti minimi brevis (Flexor brevis minimi digiti, Flexor digiti quinti brevis) lies under the metatarsal bone on the little toe, and resembles one of the Interossei.

It arises from the base of the fifth metatarsal bone, and from the sheath of the Fibularis longus; its tendon is inserted into the lateral side of the base of the first phalanx of the fifth toe.

Occasionally a few of the deeper fibers are inserted into the lateral part of the distal half of the fifth metatarsal bone; these are described by some as a distinct muscle, the opponens digiti quinti.

References
.

Foot muscles
Muscles of the lower limb